The 1990 Virginia Slims of Florida was a women's tennis tournament played on outdoor hard courts at the Boca Raton Resort & Club in Boca Raton, Florida in the United States and was part of the Tier II category of the 1990 WTA Tour. It was the 12th edition of the tournament and ran from March 5 through March 11, 1990. First-seeded Gabriela Sabatini won the singles title.

Finals

Singles
 Gabriela Sabatini defeated  Jennifer Capriati 6–4, 7–5
 It was Sabatini's 1st singles title of the year and the 14th of her career.

Doubles
 Jana Novotná /  Helena Suková defeated  Elise Burgin /  Mary Joe Fernández 6–4, 6–2
 It was Novotná's 5th doubles title of the year and the 19th of her career. It was Suková's 5th doubles title of the year and the 36th of her career.

References

External links
 ITF tournament edition details
 Tournament draws

Virginia Slims of Florida
Virginia Slims of Florida
Virginia Slims of Florida
Virginia Slims of Florida
Virginia Slims of Florida